Praseodymium(III) hydroxide is an inorganic compound with a chemical formula Pr(OH)3.

Production
The reaction between ammonia water and praseodymium(III) nitrate produces praseodymium(III) hydroxide:
 Pr(NO3)3 + 3 NH3·H2O → Pr(OH)3↓ + 3 NH4NO3

Chemical properties
Praseodymium(III) hydroxide can react with acid and produce praseodymium salts:
 Pr(OH)3 + 3 H+ → Pr3+ + 3 H2O, for example;
Pr(OH)3 + 3CH3COOH forms Pr(CH3CO2)3 + 3H2O;

Praseodymium(III) hydroxide + Acetic acid forms praseodymium(III) acetate and water.

References

Praseodymium compounds
Hydroxides